Southdown Plantation is a historic Southern plantation in Terrebonne Parish, Louisiana.

Founding and early history 
Southdown Plantation was founded in 1828 by Stephen Minor, former secretary to the Spanish Governor of Louisiana, Manuel Gayoso de Lemos. The land had first been a Spanish land grant and was later owned by brothers Jim and Rezin Bowie, who began planting and harvesting indigo there. Minor purchased the land, approximately 1,020 acres, together with James Dinsmore. In 1831, sugarcane became the principal crop, and the first sugar mill was built in 1846. By 1852, Southdown was home to 233 slaves, most of whom lived in family units on the property.

The first plantation house was built by Minor's son, William J. Minor, in 1858, and was named for a breed of sheep that the family raised. The house was built of hand-fired brick and wood from local cypress and pine trees.

The original one-story brick home was expanded in 1893, when a second story and Virginia-style colonnaded walkways were added. In the same year, Favrile glass panels depicting the plantation, palmetto leaves, magnolia branches, and sugar cane stalks were installed in the house. The plantation consisted of over 10,000 acres of sugar cane fields, a sugar mill, and a race track. Through Southdown Plantation, the Minors were instrumental in introducing and sustaining the sugar industry in the area, and ensuring the survival of the crop by developing a variety of sugar cane that was resistant to mosaic disease.

The Minor family was known for frequently entertaining guests and hosting many extravagant balls and receptions.

Modern era 
During the Great Depression in the 1930s, the Minor family lost ownership of the house. It was acquired by Realty Operators, which later renamed itself Southdown Sugar Inc. In 1979, the Southdown sugar mill was closed. Its parts were shipped to and reassembled in Guatemala, where it continued operation. It was the last of the 86 sugar mills that had operated in Terrebonne Parish during the sugar boom of the 19th century.

In 1974, the plantation was added to the National Register of Historic Places. The following year, the owner Southdown Land, a subsidiary of Southdown Sugar, donated the property to the Terrebonne Historical and Cultural Society. While the plantation house was being renovated, the original 1893 pink and green paint scheme of the exterior walls was discovered and restored. On June 27, 1982, the plantation house and servants' quarters were opened to the public as a museum.

References

 Books
 
 
 
 

 Web

External links 
 
 

Houses on the National Register of Historic Places in Louisiana
Sugar plantations in Louisiana
Houses in Terrebonne Parish, Louisiana
Museums in Terrebonne Parish, Louisiana
Historic house museums in Louisiana
Plantation houses in Louisiana
National Register of Historic Places in Terrebonne Parish, Louisiana
Houses completed in 1858
1828 establishments in Louisiana